Dolenja Vas is a former settlement in the Municipality of Naklo in the Upper Carniola region of Slovenia. It is now part of the village of Podbrezje. It was a large village on steeply eroded terraces south of the main settlement of Podbrezje.

Name
Dolenja vas literally means 'lower village'. This name and names like it are common in Slovenia and other Slavic countries, and they indicate that the settlement lay at a lower elevation than nearby settlements. In the past it was known as Unterbirkendorf in German.

History
Dolenja Vas was annexed by the village of Podbrezje in 1953, ending its existence as a separate settlement.

Notable people
Notable people that were born or lived in Dolenja Vas include:
Peter Pavlin (1853–1933), beekeeper

References

External links
Dolenja Vas on Geopedia

Populated places in the Municipality of Naklo